The Sandusky Bay Conference is a high school athletic conference in the Sandusky Bay area of north central Ohio.  It is affiliated with the Ohio High School Athletic Association.

Members
The SBC has 22 full members schools located within Erie, Huron, Ottawa, Sandusky, & Seneca counties.  The schools range in size from Division 3 to Division 7.  The reasonably short travel distances and limited range of sizes promotes tight competition throughout all sanctioned sports and a long history of membership with several rivalries.  Several member schools have won state championships.

Member school details

Athletic competition

The conference was established in 1948 and offers competition in the following sports:

baseball; boys
bowling; boys & girls
cross-country; boys & girls
basketball; boys & girls
cheerleading; boys & girls
football; boys
golf; boys & girls
soccer; boys & girls
softball; girls
swimming; boys & girls
Diving; boys & girls
tennis; boys & girls
track & field; boys & girls
volleyball; girls
wrestling; boys

Former members
Former members who are returning to the SBC with the 2016 and 2018 expansions are outlined in those sections.

League history

1940s
1948: The SBC is formed with inaugural members Danbury, Elmore, Genoa, Gibsonburg, Oak Harbor, Port Clinton & Fremont St. Joseph CC.
1949: Port Clinton leaves and is replaced by Clyde.

1950s
1950: Sandusky St. Mary CC joins.
1956: Genoa leaves to help form the Northern Lakes League.
1957: Danbury leaves.
1958: Elmore leaves and is replaced by Tiffin Calvert and Carey.
1959: Gibsonburg leaves.

1960s
1960: Lakota & Mohawk join.
1963: Carey leaves and is replaced by Margaretta & Gibsonburg, who rejoins after a four-year absence.
1966: Tiffin Calvert leaves.
1968: Huron & Fostoria St. Wendelin join.

1970s
1972: Gibsonburg, Lakota & Oak Harbor leave to form the Suburban Lakes League.  St. Wendelin also leaves the league.  They are replaced by Sandusky Perkins & Tiffin Calvert, who rejoins the league.

1980s
1980: Port Clinton leaves the Great Lakes League and rejoins after a 31-year absence.
1986: St. Joseph CC & Tiffin Calvert leave to help form the Midland Athletic League.  They are replaced by Edison, who left the Firelands Conference, and by Oak Harbor, who returns from the SLL.

2010s
2013: On February 1, St. Mary CC announced they would be forming a new league called the Sandusky River League in 2014-15 with Calvert (who instead joined the TAAC), Lakota, New Riegel, Old Fort & St. Joseph CC.  St. Wendelin would join them later.  This league's intent was to have 8 football-playing members and 2-3 non-football schools.  This league will ultimately give a home to the remaining MAL schools.
2014: On December 10, the SBC announced plans to expand. Invitations were accepted by Lakota, New Riegel, Old Fort, Fremont St. Joseph Central Catholic, Sandusky St. Mary Central Catholic & Fostoria St. Wendelin Catholic (all of which now play in the Sandusky River League), Tiffin Calvert, a former member of the SBC now a member of the TAAC, and Vermilion, currently a member of the West Shore Conference.
2016: On March 16, Clyde principal William J. Webb and the Northern Ohio League announced that the NOL will merge into the SBC for the 2017-18 school year. Bellevue, Norwalk, Sandusky, Shelby, Tiffin Columbian, and Willard will become the league's newest members.
2017: Both Gibsonburg and Danbury announced that they would leave the TAAC and return to the SBC for the 2018-2019 school year.  In April 2017, St. Wendelin announced that it would close in June following the 2016-2017 school year.
In July 2017, North Union announced they would be leaving the Mid-Ohio Athletic Conference to join the Central Buckeye Conference.  This prompted the MOAC to invite Shelby as a replacement, which they accepted.  The Whippets would spend only one year in the SBC.
2019: In August 2017 Hopewell-Loudon announced that they would leave the Blanchard Valley Conference for the Sandusky Bay Conference in the 2019-2020 school year after being offered an invitation to replace Shelby.

2020s
2021: On May 20, 2021, the school board at Woodmore announced they were going to accept the Sandusky Bay Conference's invitation to join their league for the 2023-24 school year.  It is speculated that Woodmore will play in the SBC's River Division with schools of similar enrollment size.
On May 26, 2021, the school board at Oak Harbor announced they would be leaving the SBC and accepting the Northern Buckeye Conference's invitation to replace Woodmore.
On July 19, 2021, St. Mary CC announced that they would be playing football in the Northern 8 Football Conference for the 2021 and 2022 seasons, with the intention to return to 11-man football at some point.

2016 Expansion
The first wave of expansion will begin with the 2016-17 school year and will consist of two divisions that will divide schools by size.  The larger schools will make up the Bay Division, and the smaller schools will make up the River Division.  The divisional lineup will vary depending on the sport, with Margaretta playing in the River Division for football & wrestling, and in the Bay Division for all other sports.  New Riegel & Old Fort do not have football.  The two divisions will operate more-or-less as two separate leagues under a single parent umbrella and will crown two separate champions in each sport.  There will be no forced crossovers in football and inter-divisional games will not count toward conference records.

2017 Expansion
On March 16, 2016, both Clyde principal William J. Webb and NOL president Nate Artino (Bellevue principal) announced that six of the NOL schools were invited to join the SBC for the 2017-18 school year.  Mr. Webb declined to disclose details on divisional breakdowns until all six school boards had approved the league switch.

On March 17, 2016, Norwalk Director of Student Activities Josh Schlotterer advised the divisional breakdown would be based on enrollment and some schools would slide between divisions for football and all other sports as there are three non-football members.

2018 Expansion
On March 16, 2017, SBC Executive Secretary/Treasurer Gregg Hedden announced that Danbury Local Schools would be joining the conference, effective in 2018, adding that Danbury would be a member of the River Division.

On March 20, SBC Executive Secretary/Treasurer Gregg Hedden announced that Gibsonburg Local Schools would be joining the River Division, effective 2018. Their school board voted unanimously to join at the fall of 2018 sports season. Gibsonburg leaves the Toledo Athletic Area Conference. This adds Gibsonburg as the 9th Member of the River Division.

After a school board meeting in August 2017, Hopewell-Loudon agreed to join the River Division for the 2019-2020 school year.

League Timeline

Championships

Championships

Championships - Multi-division Era

Divisional Championships - Fall Sports

Divisional Championships - Winter Sports

Divisional Championships - Spring Sports 

 Official SBC Site
 SBC Football home page
 SBC history

References

High school athletics conferences in Ohio

Ohio high school sports conferences